The 2009 Challenger Banque Nationale de Granby was a professional tennis tournament played on outdoor hard courts. It was the 16th edition of the tournament and part of the 2009 ATP Challenger Tour, offering totals of $50,000 in prize money. It took place in Granby, Quebec, Canada between July 27 and August 2, 2009.

Singles main-draw entrants

Seeds

1 Rankings are as of July 20, 2009

Other entrants
The following players received wildcards into the singles main draw:
 Bruno Agostinelli
 Frédéric Niemeyer
 Vasek Pospisil
 Milos Raonic

The following player entered the singles main draw with a special exempt:
 Daniel Evans

The following players received entry from the qualifying draw:
 Lester Cook
 Tobias Kamke
 Hiroki Kondo
 Toshihide Matsui

Champions

Singles

 Xavier Malisse def.  Kevin Anderson, 6–4, 6–4

Doubles

 Colin Fleming /  Ken Skupski def.  Amir Hadad /  Harel Levy, 6–3, 7–6(8–6)

External links
Official website

Challenger Banque Nationale de Granby
Challenger de Granby
Challenger Banque Nationale de Granby